"You're Gonna Get Yours" (sometimes subtitled "My 98 Oldsmobile") is a 1987 single by hip hop group Public Enemy from their debut album Yo! Bum Rush the Show (1987). Chuck D references the Oldsmobile 98 automobile in the song's lyrics. It peaked at number 88 on the UK Singles Chart.

MARRS sampled the song on their 1987 song "Pump Up the Volume". Red Hot Chili Peppers have been known to use the song as an intro jam during live performances of their own song, "Give It Away."

This song was also featured in the 1999 British-Irish independent film Human Traffic.

References

1987 singles
Public Enemy (band) songs
Song recordings produced by Rick Rubin
1987 songs
Def Jam Recordings singles
Songs written by Hank Shocklee
Songs written by Chuck D